Portulaca (is the type genus of the flowering plant family Portulacaceae, with over 100 species, found in the tropics and warm temperate regions. They are known as the purslanes. 

Common purslane (Portulaca oleracea) is widely consumed as an edible plant, and in some areas it is invasive. Portulaca grandiflora is a well-known ornamental garden plant. Purslanes are relished by chickens. Some Portulaca species are used as food plants by the larvae of some Lepidoptera species including the nutmeg moth (Hadula trifolii).

Species
The following species are accepted:

Portulaca africana (Danin & H.G.Baker) Danin – Western Africa to south China
Portulaca almeviae Ocampo – Mexico
Portulaca amilis Speg. – Paraguayan purslane – Peru to Brazil and N. Argentina
Portulaca anceps A.Rich. – Ethiopia
Portulaca argentinensis Speg. – Argentina
Portulaca aurantiaca Proctor – Jamaica
Portulaca australis Endl. – N. & NE. Australia to W. Central Pacific
Portulaca badamica S.R.Yadav & Dalavi – India
Portulaca bicolor F.Muell. – Australian pigweed – Australia
Portulaca biloba Urb. – Cuban purslane – Cuba
Portulaca brevifolia Urb. – Cuba to Haiti, NW. Venezuela
Portulaca bulbifera M.G.Gilbert – Ethiopia, Kenya
Portulaca californica D.Legrand – Mexico
Portulaca canariensis Danin & Reyes-Bet. – Canary Islands
Portulaca cardenasiana D.Legrand – Puerto Rican purslane – Bolivia
Portulaca caulerpoides Britton & P.Wilson – Puerto Rico
Portulaca centrali-africana R.E.Fr. – E. DR Congo to NW. Tanzania
Portulaca chacoana D.Legrand – Paraguay to NE. Argentina
Portulaca ciferrii Chiov. – S. Somalia to SE. Kenya
Portulaca clavigera R.Geesink – Western Australia
Portulaca colombiana D.Legrand – Colombia to Venezuela
Portulaca commutata M.G.Gilbert – S. Ethiopia to N. Tanzania
Portulaca confertifolia Hauman – Argentina
Portulaca conoidea S.M.Phillips – Kenya
Portulaca constricta M.G.Gilbert – Ethiopia, Somalia
Portulaca conzattii P.Wilson – Mexico to Central America
Portulaca coralloides S.M.Phillips – Kenya
Portulaca cryptopetala Speg. – Argentina, Bolivia, Brazil, Paraguay, Uruguay
Portulaca cubensis Britton & P.Wilson – Cuba
Portulaca cyclophylla F.Muell. – Western Australia
Portulaca cypria Danin – Mediterranian
Portulaca daninii Galasso, Banfi & Soldano – Brazil, Colombia, Peru, Suriname
Portulaca decipiens Poelln. – Australia
Portulaca decorticans M.G.Gilbert – Kenya, Somalia
Portulaca dhofarica M.G.Gilbert – Oman
Portulaca diegoi Mattos – Brazil
Portulaca digyna F.Muell. – Australia
Portulaca dodomaensis M.G.Gilbert – Tanzania
Portulaca echinosperma Hauman – Argentina
Portulaca edulis Danin & Bagella – Cyprus
Portulaca elatior Mart. ex Rohrb. – Caribbean to S. Tropical America
Portulaca elongata Rusby – Argentina, Bolivia, Peru
Portulaca eruca Hauman – Argentina, Paraguay
Portulaca erythraeae Schweinf. – Eritrea, Sudan
Portulaca fascicularis Peter – Kenya, Tanzania
Portulaca filifolia F.Muell. – Australia
Portulaca filsonii J.H.Willis – Australia
Portulaca fischeri Pax – Kenya, Tanzania, Uganda
Portulaca fluvialis D.Legrand – Argentina, Bolivia, Brazil, Paraguay, Peru, Uruguay
Portulaca foliosa Ker Gawl. – Tropical & S. Africa, Arabian Peninsula
Portulaca fragilis Poelln. – Bolivia
Portulaca frieseana Poelln. – Brazil
Portulaca fulgens Griseb. – Argentina
Portulaca gilliesii Hook. – Argentina, Bolivia, Paraguay, Uruguay
Portulaca giuliettiae T.Vieira & A.A.Coelho – Brazil
Portulaca goiasensis T.Vieira & A.A.Coelho – Brazil
Portulaca gracilis Poelln. – Bolivia
Portulaca grandiflora Hook. – moss-rose purslane – Argentina, Bolivia, Brazil, Paraguay, Uruguay
Portulaca grandis Peter – Ethiopia, Kenya, Tanzania, Uganda
Portulaca granulatostellulata (Poelln.) Ricceri & Arrigoni – W. Europe to Caucasus; N. Africa to W. Indian ocean
Portulaca greenwayi M.G.Gilbert – Kenya
Portulaca guanajuatensis Ocampo – Mexico
Portulaca halimoides L. – silkcotton purslane – Central & S. U.S.A. to Tropical America
Portulaca hatschbachii D.Legrand – Brazil
Portulaca hereroensis Schinz – Tanzania to S. Africa
Portulaca heterophylla Peter – Tanzania
Portulaca hirsutissima Cambess. – Brazil
Portulaca hoehnei D.Legrand – Brazil
Portulaca howellii (D.Legrand) Eliasson – Galápagos
Portulaca humilis Peter – Tanzania
Portulaca impolita (Danin & H.G.Baker) Danin – U.S.A.
Portulaca insignis Steyerm. – Venezuela
Portulaca intraterranea J.M.Black – Australia
Portulaca johnstonii Henrickson – Mexico
Portulaca juliomartinezii Ocampo – Mexico
Portulaca kermesina N.E.Br. – Eritrea to S. Africa, Arabian Peninsula
Portulaca kuriensis M.G.Gilbert – Socotra
Portulaca lakshminarasimhaniana S.R.Yadav & Dalavi – India
Portulaca lutea Sol. ex G.Forst. – yellow purslane – Pacific
Portulaca macbridei D.Legrand – Peru
Portulaca macrantha Ricceri & Arrigoni – Canary Islands, Morocco
Portulaca macrorhiza R.Geesink – Lesser Sunda Islands
Portulaca macrosperma D.Legrand – Bolivia
Portulaca masonii D.Legrand – Mexico
Portulaca massaica S.M.Phillips – Kenya, Tanzania
Portulaca matthewsii Ocampo – Mexico
Portulaca mauritiensis Poelln. – Chagos Archipelago, Mascarenes
Portulaca mexicana P.Wilson – Mexico
Portulaca meyeri D.Legrand – Argentina
Portulaca minensis D.Legrand – Brazil
Portulaca minuta Correll – Florida, Bahamas
Portulaca molokiniensis Hobdy – Hawaiian Islands
Portulaca monanthoides Lodé – Socotra
Portulaca mucronata Link – Bolivia, Paraguay, Venezuela
Portulaca mucronulata D.Legrand – Argentina, Brazil
Portulaca nicaraguensis (Danin & H.G.Baker) Danin – Florida, Guatemala, Nicaragua, Texas
Portulaca nitida (Danin & H.G.Baker) Ricceri & Arrigoni – Europe to Central Asia, N. Africa
Portulaca nivea Poelln. – Peru
Portulaca nogalensis Chiov. – Somalia
Portulaca oblonga Peter – Ethiopia, Kenya, Tanzania
Portulaca obtusa Poelln. – Argentina
Portulaca obtusifolia D.Legrand – Argentina
Portulaca okinawensis E.Walker & Tawada – Ryukyu Islands
Portulaca oleracea L. – common purslane, pigweed – Macaronesia, Tropical Africa, Mediterranian to Pakistan and Arabian Peninsula
Portulaca oligosperma F.Muell. – Australia
Portulaca olosirwa S.M.Phillips – Kenya
Portulaca papillatostellulata (Danin & H.G.Baker) Danin – Europe to Mediterranian
Portulaca papulifera D.Legrand – Argentina
Portulaca papulosa Schltdl. – Argentina, Uruguay
Portulaca paucistaminata Poelln. – Cuba
Portulaca perennis R.E.Fr. – Argentina, Bolivia, Peru
Portulaca peteri Poelln. – Ethiopia, Kenya, Tanzania
Portulaca philippii I.M.Johnst. – Bolivia, Chile
Portulaca pilosa L. – shaggy purslane – Hawaiian Islands, southern U.S.A. to Tropical & Subtropical S.America
Portulaca psammotropha Hance – Southern China to Philippines
Portulaca pusilla Kunth – Colombia, Venezuela
Portulaca pygmaea Steyerm. – Colombia, Venezuela
Portulaca quadrifida L. – chickenweed purslane – Tropical & Subtropical Old World to SW. Pacific
Portulaca ragonesei D.Legrand – Argentina
Portulaca ramosa Peter – Tanzania
Portulaca rausii Danin – Mediterranian
Portulaca rhodesiana R.A.Dyer & E.A.Bruce – South Africa, Zimbabwe
Portulaca rotundifolia R.E.Fr. – Argentina, Bolivia
Portulaca rubricaulis Kunth – redstem purslane – SE. Mexico, Florida to Caribbean, Venezuela to Ecuador
Portulaca rzedowskiana Ocampo – Mexico
Portulaca samhaensis A.G.Mill. – Socotra
Portulaca samoensis Poelln. – New Guinea to SW. Pacific
Portulaca sanctae-martae Poelln. – Colombia
Portulaca sardoa Danin, Bagella & Marrosu – Corsica, Sardinia
Portulaca saxifragoides Welw. ex Oliv. – Angola
Portulaca sclerocarpa A.Gray – Ihi makole – Hawaiian Islands
Portulaca sedifolia N.E.Br. – French Guiana, Guyana, Suriname, Venezuela
Portulaca sedoides Welw. ex Oliv. – Angola
Portulaca sicula Danin, Domina & Raimondo – Sicilia
Portulaca smallii P.Wilson – Small's purslane – Georgia, North Carolina, South Carolina, Virginia
Portulaca socotrana Domina & Raimondo – Socotra
Portulaca somalica N.E.Br. – Somalia
Portulaca stellulatotuberculata Poelln. – Paraguay
Portulaca stuhlmannii Poelln. – Tanzania
Portulaca suffrutescens Engelm. – shrubby purslane – Arizona, Mexico, New Mexico, Texas
Portulaca suffruticosa Wight – India, Sri Lanka
Portulaca sundaensis Poelln. – Lesser Sunda Islands
Portulaca thellusonii Lindl. – Brazil
Portulaca tingoensis J.F.Macbr. – Argentina, Peru
Portulaca trianthemoides Bremek. – Limpopo
Portulaca trituberculata Danin, Domina & Raimondo – Canary Islands, E. Central Europe to Mediterranian
Portulaca tuberculata León – Cuba, Cayman Islands
Portulaca tuberosa Roxb. – Indian subcontinent to N. Australia
Portulaca umbraticola Kunth – wingpod purslane – Mexico to Tropical America
Portulaca werdermannii Poelln. – Brazil
Portulaca wightiana Wall. ex Wight & Arn. – South Africa to Ethiopia, India, Sri Lanka
Portulaca yecorensis Henrickson & T.Van Devender – Mexico
Portulaca zaffranii Danin – Mediterranian

Formerly placed here
Anacampseros arachnoides (Haw.) Sims (as P. arachnoides Haw.)
Anacampseros filamentosa subsp. filamentosa (as P. filamentosa Haw.)
Anacampseros lanceolata subsp. lanceolata (as P. lanceolata Haw.)
Anacampseros rufescens (Haw.) Sweet (as P. rufescens Haw.)
Anacampseros telephiastrum DC. (as P. anacampseros L.)
Sesuvium portulacastrum (L.) L. (as P. portulacastrum L.)
Talinum fruticosum (L.) Juss. (as P. fruticosa L. or P. triangularis Jacq.)
Talinum paniculatum (Jacq.) Gaertn. (as P. paniculata Jacq. or P. patens L.)

Gallery

References

External links

 
Caryophyllales genera